Angrakshak (Bodyguard) is a 1995 Indian action thriller film starring Sunny Deol, Pooja Bhatt and Kulbhushan Kharbanda. Originally, Divya Bharti signed up for it. But due to her sudden death, she was replaced by Pooja.

Story 
Priyanka (Priya) (Pooja Bhatt) is a teenager who lives a very wealthy lifestyle with her widower politician father, Satyendra Pal Choudhary (Kulbhushan Kharbanda). Satyendra owes his allegiance to the Bharatiya Ekta Party. As Satyendra's popularity rises, he fears for his life and that of his daughter's and, as a result, hires a bodyguard (Angrakshak) named Ajay (Sunny Deol) for Priyanka. Gradually, Priyanka and Ajay fall in love with each other. With the elections approaching, and Satyendra's growing popularity creates some uncertainty with other political parties; as a result, Priyanka is kidnapped, and Ajay is seriously wounded while trying to protect her and is hospitalized. When the news is made public, a wave of sympathy moves in Satyendra's favor, and he is sure to win the election. Priyanka's abductors demand two crore rupees, but before Satyendra could respond, the police find a body of a young woman, who is presumed to be that of Priyanka. A grieving Satyendra is shown on national television before a shocked nation, and he wins the election hands down. How Ajay rescues his love (Priyanka) from the kidnappers and solves the mystery, form the rest of the story.

Cast
 Sunny Deol... Ajay
 Pooja Bhatt... Priyanka "Priya" Choudhary
 Kulbhushan Kharbanda... Satyendra Pal Choudhary
 Saeed Jaffrey... Sanghvi
 Rami Reddy... Velu Bhai
 Amita Nangia... Asha, Ajay's sister
 Mohnish Bahl... Vijay (special appearance)

Production
Actress Divya Bharti was originally signed for the female lead. But due to her sudden death, she was replaced by Pooja Bhatt.

Soundtrack

Anand–Milind composed the music of this film. Sameer wrote the lyrics. The song Dil Mera Churane Laga was quite popular when the album released, especially for Sunny Deol's dance moves. The tune of "Haule Haule Dil Dole" was inspired from the Telugu song "Malli Malli Idi Rani roju" from the movie Rakshasudu(1986), which was composed by Maestro Ilaiyaraaja. The tune of "Dil Mera Udaas Hai" was inspired from the Tamil song "Aasaiya Kathula" from the movie Johnny(1980), which was composed by Maestro Ilaiyaraaja.

References

External links

1995 films
1990s Hindi-language films
Films scored by Anand–Milind
Films directed by Ravi Raja Pinisetty
1995 action thriller films
Hindi-language action films
Indian action thriller films